The Economy of the Ashanti Empire was largely a pre-industrial and agrarian economy. The Ashanti established different procedures for mobilizing state revenue and utilizing public finance. Ashanti trade extended upon two main trade routes; one at the North and the other at the South. The Northern trade route was dominated by the trade in Kola nuts and at the South, the Ashanti engaged in the Atlantic Slave Trade. A variety of economic industries such as cloth-weaving and metal working industries existed. The Ashanti originally farmed in subsistence until agriculture became extensive during the 19th century.

State revenues 
Gold dust was the main currency of the Ashanti Empire. Mperedwan or Peregwan was the highest denomination in Ashanti. One Peregwan was equal to an Ashanti weight of 2.25 troy ounces. The Ashanti government depended on taxes as a source of government revenue. According to Ratray, the main forms of gaining revenue for the government were through death duties, trade, court fees and fines as well as mining revenues. The Gyaasehene was an office responsible for the empire's national treasury. The collection of revenue was decentralized. All Paramount Chiefs and Sub-Chiefs possessed a local treasury in their jurisdiction which was managed under the auspices of the Sanaahene, the Royal Treasurer. It was the local treasury that the chiefs contained their revenue into. Death dues were paid by the family of the deceased. The value of the deceased's estate was assessed but scholars such as Kwame Afosa have asserted that the amount to be paid was left to the discretion of the relatives of the deceased. Court fees were divided in predetermined proportions among members of the tribunal present at the court as well as the divisional chiefs and the attendants of the palace. Fines inflicted upon guilty litigants were paid into the treasury of the Chief. In the court of the Asantehene, penalties attached to oaths which were paid by defaulters after court proceedings amounted to as much as 101.25 Peregwan (£810).  which means "head price" was a fine paid by individuals pronounced liable to death sentence. The price could amount to £800. Revenue was also acquired from gold mining. One third of the proceeds went to the tenant on whose land the mines were worked upon. The remainder was given to the chief and sub chief who presided over the region.

The Ashanti had an effective system of accounting to control public funds. The treasury system of Ashanti was similar to the Imprest system. Historian Afosa, likens the Adaka Kesie to a Current Account and the Apim Adaka to a Petty Cash account. Adaka Kesie was partitioned into three compartments and according to Kwame Afosa, "All three partitions contained gold dust each for the value of one Peregwan (£8). Nothing less than a Peregwan was deposited into the box and nothing less than that was taken out. The Apim Adaka served as the source of government expenditure. Whenever a Peregwan (£8) was withdrawn from the Adaka Kesie, it was placed into the Apim Adaka. The money in the Apim Adaka was weighed in small packets in order to be used for purchases. The Royal Treasurer was assisted by three officials during financial transactions with the boxes. Paying into or taking out of the boxes were recorded in cowries and witnessed by three persons other than the Royal Treasurer. In the early 19th century, 400,000 oz of gold dust at a value of £1.5 million at that time, was required to keep the Adaka Kesie full. War taxes were based on the expenditure on guns and ammunition and they were shared among the divisions, sub-divisions, villages and lineages of the empire. These war taxes were used to meet war expenses.

Tributary States 
According to Bowdich, the Ashanti had not less than 21 tributary states by 1819. They included Gyaaman, Takyiman, Dagbon, Gonja and Denkyira. The annual tribute was paid in gold, slaves, cattle, poultry, and native manufactured cloth. Failure to pay tribute was equivalent to a rebellion. Conquered states at the Coast under Ashanti jurisdiction were responsible for collecting Notes from European traders at trading posts. These Notes which were received by the chiefs of the coastal states were given to the Ashanti as tributes. Before the Fanti war of 1807, the Ashanti king held Notes on three Accra forts which had been captured from the Akim in 1730, on Axim fort, and also on the Elmina Castle. A total sum of ten ounces a year was derived as tribute in the form of notes. The amount could also be paid in goods such as firearms. The possession of Notes enabled the king of Ashanti, on occasion, to secure credit for muskets and ammunition.

Trade 
In the early 19th century, markets became essential in Ashanti economy. Markets were held daily from eight o'clock in the morning until sunset. Bowdich pointed out that these markets had about sixty stalls and sheds. Foreign imports into these markets included pillows, pipes, tobacco and brassware. There was the presence of internal marketing and retailing. Marketing and retailing were done by both man and women. Market sellers were taxed by toll collectors.

The main Ashanti trade routes were located at the North and South. The northern trade routes involved trade contacts with forest savannah fringes of the Brong districts in modern Ghana, east-central and northern Ivory Coast, Upper Volta and Dahomey. The southern trade route was established at the coast. At the market towns on the northern trade routes, the Ashanti merchants exchanged kola nuts for salt and European goods for shea butter, livestock, cotton silk threads and cloths, metal locks, gold and slaves. In the Southern trade route, the Ashanti sold gold, ivory, slaves and rubber in exchange for firearms, lead bars, gunpowder, drinks and salt. Ashanti rulers commanded the bulk of the trade with Europeans at the coast. Commoners participated in the trade with Europeans at the coast only from the late 19th century. The northern trade saw participation by all individuals and families irrespective of their social status. After the early 19th century ban on the Atlantic Slave Trade south, the Ashanti invested more into the northern trade. Dalrymple-Smith adds that the Ashanti invested in the northern trade before 1808. Long-distance trading was carried out by occasional, professional and state funded traders. Traders of Ashanti gold and slaves were taxed at the borders of the empire.

Industry 
Certain villages were specialized in a particular craft. It was common for the Ashanti government to settle war captives with craft skills in such villages. The village of Bonwire was specialized in cloth-weaving. Ntonso was specialized in cloth-dyeing, Pankrono in pottery, Ahwiaa in wood working, Breman and Adum in goldsmithing and metalworking. All these villages and settlement were located 15 miles of Kumasi. Blacksmiths, joinery and pottery makers were located throughout the empire.

Mining 
Mining was both an individual and communal chore. Individuals along with children partook in gold panning and shaft mining whiles slaves formed the major labor force on gold mines. Much of the state's gold originated from mines although some gold could be obtained by panning in streams. Deep shafts were common and such mines could reach 100 feet deep. They were connected by tunnels "several hundred feet in length." An example given by historian Edgerton is a mine that had a timber-shored tunnel 300 yards long and contained galleries where the gold was worked. Miners had to dig or chop Feldspar and granite in the mines but gunpowder could be used as explosives to blast hard rock. The ore obtained was transported to crushing areas where they were crushed by hammers on stone slabs and the remains were milled. The powder obtained from the milling process was washed in order to extract the gold from the powder.

Slave trade 
Trade in slaves was a major tradition in pre-colonial Ashanti culture. Slaves were typically taken as captives from enemies in warfare. Perbi states that the Ashanti Empire was the largest slave owning state in the territory of modern Ghana during the Atlantic slave trade. During the reign of Asantehene Osei Kwame Panyin (1777–1803), the sale of Ashanti citizens into slavery was banned. Wilks argues that the economy of Ashanti "was not one based upon slave-raiding for export purposes". He cites Asantehene Osei Bonsu's speech to Dupuis in 1820;
 He also references Brodie Cruickshank, who wrote in 1853 that "The Ashantee wars are never undertaken expressly to supply this demand." Wilks writes that slaves were more important to the Ashanti economy in the form of domestic labor in the agricultural and industrial sector than for export in the Atlantic slave trade. Some historians such as Reid and Dalrymple-Smith have commented that the Ashanti economy did not depend on the Atlantic slave trade. Stilwell states that the Ashanti rulers traded in slaves but "also sought other economic options."

Agriculture 
From the 17th century, the Ashanti economy revolved around the rural production of staple crops which was supplemented by hunting. Ashanti agriculture was in a subsistence form during this time period. Throughout history, the Ashanti used the axe, cutlass, billhook and hoe for clearing and maintaining the land. Ashanti farmers practiced both land and crop rotation. The basic Ashanti farm was made up of the land containing the crops and the non-farm land under fallow. From the 19th century, agriculture became intensified and extensive especially in and around Kumasi. According to Bowdich in 1817, crops around Esereso near Kumasi, were planted in triangular beds with small drains around each. Both Bowdich and Dupuis noted the existence of large fenced yam fields which were planted in rectangular lines. Huttonn who accompanied Dupuis in 1820, stated that several plantations near Kumasi were enclosed. Some cleared grounds covered as much as 2 acres. These lands were laid out in small beds which were not "dissimilar, or much inferior, to the country gardens in Europe." 

Certain farms such as Kola plantations were established with the exclusive aim of generating revenue for into the chief's treasury. These types of farms were known as Stool plantations. Crops that were cultivated in the empire included plantains, yams, manioc, corn, peanuts and tomatoes. In addition, animal husbandry was prominent as pig farming and other livestock were reared in the 19th century. Bowdich documents the use of a fishing weir by settlements about 60 miles southwest of Kumasi.

References

Bibliography 

 

Ashanti Empire
Economies by former country